Farsiat-e Kuchek (also Romanized as Fārsīāt-e Kūchek, Farsīāt-e Kūchak, and Fārseyāt-e Kūchek; also known as Fārsīāt and Farsiyat) is a village in Muran Rural District, in the Soveyseh District of Karun County, Khuzestan Province, Iran. At the 2006 census, its population was 261, in 59 families.

References 

Populated places in Karun County